Panguru is a community in the northern Hokianga harbour, in Northland, New Zealand. The Whakarapa Stream flows from the Panguru Range in the Warawara Forest to the west, through Panguru and into the Hokianga.

Demographics
The SA1 area is part of the larger Hokianga North statistical area.

The SA1 statistical area had a population of 96 at the 2018 New Zealand census, an increase of 3 people (3.2%) since the 2013 census, and a decrease of 9 people (−8.6%) since the 2006 census. There were 48 households, comprising 42 males and 51 females, giving a sex ratio of 0.82 males per female. The median age was 52.2 years (compared with 37.4 years nationally), with 18 people (18.8%) aged under 15 years, 9 (9.4%) aged 15 to 29, 42 (43.8%) aged 30 to 64, and 24 (25.0%) aged 65 or older.

Ethnicities were 15.6% European/Pākehā, 87.5% Māori, and 6.2% Pacific peoples. People may identify with more than one ethnicity.

Of those people who chose to answer the census's question about religious affiliation, 9.4% had no religion, 81.2% were Christian and 3.1% had Māori religious beliefs.

Of those at least 15 years old, 9 (11.5%) people had a bachelor's or higher degree, and 18 (23.1%) people had no formal qualifications. The median income was $17,400, compared with $31,800 nationally. 3 people (3.8%) earned over $70,000 compared to 17.2% nationally. The employment status of those at least 15 was that 18 (23.1%) people were employed full-time, 15 (19.2%) were part-time, and 6 (7.7%) were unemployed.

Hokianga North statistical area
Hokianga North statistical area covers the western side of the area between Hokianga Harbour and Whangape Harbour, including the locality of Matihetihe.

Hokianga North had a population of 795 at the 2018 New Zealand census, an increase of 51 people (6.9%) since the 2013 census, and a decrease of 18 people (−2.2%) since the 2006 census. There were 294 households, comprising 399 males and 396 females, giving a sex ratio of 1.01 males per female. The median age was 42.6 years (compared with 37.4 years nationally), with 201 people (25.3%) aged under 15 years, 120 (15.1%) aged 15 to 29, 312 (39.2%) aged 30 to 64, and 159 (20.0%) aged 65 or older.

Ethnicities were 25.3% European/Pākehā, 86.0% Māori, 7.5% Pacific peoples, 0.8% Asian, and 0.4% other ethnicities. People may identify with more than one ethnicity.

The percentage of people born overseas was 3.8, compared with 27.1% nationally.

Of those people who chose to answer the census's question about religious affiliation, 16.2% had no religion, 73.6% were Christian and 4.2% had Māori religious beliefs.

Of those at least 15 years old, 48 (8.1%) people had a bachelor's or higher degree, and 168 (28.3%) people had no formal qualifications. The median income was $17,900, compared with $31,800 nationally. 30 people (5.1%) earned over $70,000 compared to 17.2% nationally. The employment status of those at least 15 was that 150 (25.3%) people were employed full-time, 93 (15.7%) were part-time, and 54 (9.1%) were unemployed.

History and culture
Panguru began as a Catholic settlement. It was named Whakarapa until 1923, when Whina Cooper called a public meeting that led to the name being changed to distinguish it from another settlement of that name.

There are three marae in the area connected to Te Rarawa hapū:

 Ngāti Manawa or Te Waiariki Marae and Te Rarawa meeting house are affiliated with Ngāti Manawa, Te Kai Tutae and Te Waiariki.
 Waipuna Marae and Te Puna I Te Ao Marama meeting house are affiliated with Te Kai Tutae and Te Waiariki.
 Waihou or Waimirirangi Marae and Te Puna o te Ora meeting house are affiliated with Ngāti Te Rēinga.

Education
Te Kura Taumata o Panguru is a coeducational composite (years 1-15) school with a roll of  students as of 

It was the smallest high school in New Zealand at the time of its establishment in 1964.

Notable people
 

 Adam Blair, Rugby league player
 Dame Whina Cooper, respected Māori elder
 Piipi Raumati Cummins, Māori tribal leader, kauri-gum dealer, storekeeper and land rights activist

Notes

External links
 Kuru Panguru

Hokianga
Populated places in the Northland Region